The 1988 NCAA Division III women's basketball tournament was the seventh annual tournament hosted by the NCAA to determine the national champion of Division III women's collegiate basketball in the United States.

Concordia Moorhead defeated St. John Fisher in the championship game, 65–57, to claim the Cobbers' first NCAA Division III national title and second overall.

The championship rounds were hosted by Concordia College in Moorhead, Minnesota.

Bracket
First Round (round of 32)
 St. John Fisher 88, SUNY Cortland 69
 Nazareth 79, Buffalo St. 76
 Ohio Northern 66, Rowan 53
 TCNJ 74, Kean 73
 Elizabethtown 71, Thiel 55
 Frank. & Marsh. 75, Lycoming 59
 Salem St. 80, Western Conn. St. 77 (OT)
 Southern Me. 68, Emmanuel (MA) 61
 Rust 83, Va. Wesleyan 49
 UNC Greensboro 81, Centre 77
 Washington-St. Louis 68, North Park 61
 Luther 53, William Penn 50
 St. Norbert 79, Wis.-River Falls 78
 Wis.-La Crosse 68, Calvin 65
 Concordia-M’head 85, Cal St. San B’dino 61
 St. Thomas (MN) 68, Stanislaus St. 62

Regional Finals (round of sixteen)
 St. John Fisher 77, Nazareth 49
 Ohio Northern 73, TCNJ 58
 Frank. & Marsh. 68, Elizabethtown 65
 Southern Me. 60, Salem St. 56
 UNC Greensboro 66, Rust 64
 Luther 58, Washington-St. Louis 54
 Wis.-La Crosse 83, St. Norbert 81
 Concordia-M’head 77, St. Thomas (MN) 58

Elite Eight

All-tournament team
 Jessica Beachy, Concordia–Moorhead
 Jillayn Quaschnick, Concordia–Moorhead
 Michelle Thykeson, Concordia–Moorhead
 Diana Duff, Southern Maine
 Shelly Bayhurst, St. John Fisher

See also
 1988 NCAA Division III men's basketball tournament
 1988 NCAA Division I women's basketball tournament
 1988 NCAA Division II women's basketball tournament
 1988 NAIA women's basketball tournament

References

 
NCAA Division III women's basketball tournament
1988 in sports in Pennsylvania